Bungalow 13 is a 1948 American crime drama film starring Tom Conway.

Plot
Private detective Christopher Adams chases a precious antique jade lion through the Mexican cafes, auto courts, and the seamy side of Los Angeles.

Adams has a meeting scheduled with a mystery man named Gomez, who is killed. Alice Ashley, a woman he encounters in a bar, then picks Adams' pocket, stealing his wallet. When he tracks her down, he finds Alice stabbed to death. Nosy neighbor Theresa Appleby happens upon the scene after Adams arrives.

A police lieutenant, Sam Wilson, immediately suspects Adams of murdering the woman. Investigating together, they conclude that a bartender, Patrick Macy, once engaged to Adams, is behind the killings. Mrs. Appleby also helps a grateful Adams in solving the case.

Cast 

 Tom Conway as Christopher Adams
 Margaret Hamilton as Mrs. Theresa Appleby
 Richard Cromwell as Patrick Macy
 James Flavin as Lt. Sam Wilson
 Marjorie Hoshelle as Alice Ashley
 Frank Cady as Gus Barton
 Eddie Acuff as José Fernando
 Jody Gilbert as Mrs. Martha Barton
 Juan Varro as Pedro Gomez
 Lyle Latell as Willie
 Mildred Coles as Hibiscus
 John Davidson as Mr. Eden
 Cy Kendall as Police Officer (unbilled)
 Robert Malcolm as Sergeant Cox (unbilled)
 Anne Nagel as Henrietta (unbilled)

External links 

 
 Turner Classic Movies page

1948 films
1948 mystery films
American mystery films
20th Century Fox films
American black-and-white films
1940s English-language films
1940s American films